Amaia Zubiria (born 1947) is a Spanish-Basque singer who was born in Usurbil in the Basque province of Gipuzkoa. She started singing with Txomin Artola with whom she formed the Haizea band. She toured the Basque Country, singing adaptations of the local folk songs. She has recorded several albums since 1985, some with other singers such as Pascal Gaigne, some as a soloist.

In 1993, she began singing solo with Amonaren Mengantza which she sang at Mexico's Durango Festival in 1995. Together with Gaigne, Luis Camio and 
José Angel Lorán, she sang Sustrai zahar and Kimu berri based on her research into Basque folklore.

For soundtrack of the film La fuga de Segovia (1981) she sang Maite zaitut Maite. She went on to contribute to the films Zergatik Panpox (1986), Ander eta Yul (1989), Loraldia (1991) and Santa Cruz, el cura guerrillero (1991). She has also collaborated with the artists Angel Illarmendi, Julia León, Josean Goikoetxea and Iñaki Salvador. Her voice can also be heard in the animated film La isla del cangrejo and in Yoyes, both of which received awards.

In 2001, Zubiria was a member of the jury for the Basque Singers' Championship. Her album Haatik (2002) presents highlights from her career together with six new tracks.

Now considered one of the Basque Country's most successful stars, Amaia Zubiria has continued to present her songs at concerts.

References

1947 births
Living people
People from Usurbil
Basque singers
20th-century Spanish singers
21st-century Spanish singers
Spanish pop singers
Spanish women pop singers
Spanish rock singers
20th-century Spanish women singers
21st-century Spanish women singers